This is an alphabetical list of villages in Kadapa district, Andhra Pradesh, India.

A 

 Akkayapalle
 Amagampalli
 Arakatavemula
 Araveedu
 Atlur
 Attirala
 B. Kodur
 Bhumayapalle
 Boggudupalli
 Brahmamgari Matham

C 

 Chakarayapet
 Chapadu
 Chemmumiahpet
 Chennur, Kadapa district
 Chilamkur
 Chinnachowk
 Chinnaiahgaripalli
 Chinnamandem
 Chinnapasupula
 Chinnayarasala Harijanawada
 Chinthakommadinne
 Chitvel

D–E 

 Dammanapalli
 Duvvur
 Dwaraka Nagar
 E. Kothapalli
 Endapalli

G–H 

 Gadeguduru
 Galiveedu
 Gandikota
 Gandikovvur
 Garalamadugu
 Himakuntla

K 

 Kalasapadu
 Kamalakur
 Kamalapuram
 Kavalakuntla
 Kesalingayapalli
 Khajipet Sunkesula
 Kondam Palli
 Kondapuram
 Korrapadu
 Kumpinipuram

L–O 

 Lakkireddipalle
 Lakshmigari Palli
 Lingala
 Maduru
 Mallepalli
 Mantapampalle
 Mylavaram
 Nandalur
 Obulareddypeta
 Onipenta

P 

 Pamuluru
 Pathagollapalle
 Pedda Orampadu
 Peddamudium
 Peddapasupula
 Peddullapalli
 Pedduru
 Penagalur
 Pendlimarri
 Porumamilla
 Potladurthi
 Pullampeta
 Puttanavari Palli

R–S 

 R. Rachapalli
 Rajampet
 Rajasaheb Pet
 Rajupalem
 Ramapuram
 Rayavaram
 Sambepalle
 Sangala Palli
 Siddavatam
 Siddayya Gari Matham
 Simhadripuram
 Surabhi

T 

 T. Chowdaravaripalli
 T. Sundupalle
 Tallapaka
 Tallaproddatur
 Tangatur
 Tekurpeta
 Thallamapuram
 Thimmarajupally
 Thimmasamudram
 Thondur

V–Y 

 Vaparala
 Veeraballe
 Veeraballi
 Veerapunayunipalle
 Velavali
 Vellala
 Vempalle
 Vemula
 Vontimitta
 Yerra Cheruvu Palli

Kadapa district